Haemanthus sanguineus is a South African bulbous geophyte in the genus Haemanthus that occurs in the fynbos vegetation of the Western Cape.

This endemic fynbos geophyte is dormant during the summer and cannot be seen. In the autumn a striking crimson inflorescence emerges from the ground. This consists of a crimson stem that bears a mass of tiny red, crimson and yellow individual flowers.

The plant then produces two circular leathery leaves in the autumn and winter. These lie flat on the ground and are typically edged with scarlet hairs. They are a deep green on the upper surface and underneath are covered in pink and red spots.

See also
Index: Fynbos

Gallery

References

External links
 

sanguineus
Endemic flora of South Africa
Flora of the Cape Provinces
Fynbos